Henry County is located in the north central portion of the U.S. state of Georgia. Per the 2020 census, the population of Henry County is 240,712, up from 203,922 in 2010. The county seat is McDonough. The county was named for Patrick Henry.

Henry County is part of the Atlanta-Sandy Springs-Roswell, GA metropolitan statistical area. The Henry County Courthouse is listed on the National Register of Historic Places.

History 

Henry County, Georgia, was created by the Georgia State Legislature in 1821 from land acquired from the Creek Indian Nation by the First Treaty of Indian Springs. Henry's original land area was much larger than it is today, stretching from near Indian Springs (present-day Indian Springs State Park) in the south to the Chattahoochee River near Sandy Springs in the north; encompassing most of present-day Metropolitan Atlanta. Before one year had passed, the size of the county was diminished through the separation of land areas which, in whole or in part, became the present-day DeKalb, Fulton, Fayette and Newton counties. Later divisions resulted in Clayton, Spalding, Rockdale and Butts counties.

In the beginning Henry County was a virgin wilderness, having just been ceded from the Creek Nation. Prior to 1821, the Creeks and a few trappers and traders were the only residents of this area. The Creek Indians left their mark through place names, a few small Indian Mounds scattered around the County and through the arrowheads and broken pottery which can be found throughout Henry County.

Jesse Johnson, son of John Johnson and great-grandfather of U.S. President Lyndon Baines Johnson, was a "first settler" of Henry County. He was a prosperous farmer, the second sheriff (1822–1835), and judge, before he moved to Texas.
In 1995, Henry County was the sixth-fastest-growing county in the United States.

Geography

The vast majority of Henry County is located in the Upper Ocmulgee River sub-basin of the Altamaha River basin, with just a very small western corner, west of Hampton, located in the Upper Flint River sub-basin of the ACF River Basin (Apalachicola-Chattahoochee-Flint River Basin).

Adjacent counties
 DeKalb County – north
 Rockdale County – northeast
 Newton County – east-Northeast
 Butts County – southeast
 Spalding County – southwest
 Clayton County – west

Government and politics 
The Henry County Board of Commissioners is responsible for administering county government to residents. Four commissioners are elected by voters in individual districts, while the commission chairman is elected countywide and serves as the county's chief executive. June Wood, the former commission chair, was the first African-American to serve in the position after being elected in a December 2016 run-off election. She left office in December 2020 after losing her bid for re-election. As of January 2023, the following individuals serve the county on the Board of Commissioners:

Prior to 1984, Henry County had a presidential voting pattern typical of any other Solid South county in Georgia, consistently awarding landslide margins to Democrats. In 1920, it was one of three counties in the state (alongside Bleckley and Columbia) to give 100% of the vote to Democratic nominee James M. Cox. The first Republican to win Henry County was Richard Nixon in 1972, doing so with 77.93% of the vote, though it returned to the Democratic column when native Georgian Jimmy Carter won it in 1976 and 1980.

From 1984 to 2004, Henry County was a Republican stronghold, consistent with several Atlanta suburbs, as well as other suburban areas across the country. Strong margins in Henry County and other Atlanta suburbs were vital to Republicans' performance, offsetting strongly Democratic Black voters in Atlanta proper. Republican dominance peaked in 1988, when George H.W. Bush won 71.11% of the vote to Michael Dukakis' 28.41%, a 42.7% margin of victory. During this time, no Democrat managed to attain even 40 percent of the county's vote.

In the 2010s, the country rapidly flipped from being safely Republican at the start of the decade to safely Democratic by the end, thanks to explosive population growth that brought an influx of Democratic-leaning minority voters into the county, and a growing Democratic trend among suburban voters in general. The African American percentage of the population increased from 14.7% in the 2000 Census to 36.9% in 2010 and 48.4% in 2020, while the white proportion of the population fell from 81.4% in 2000 to 55.0% in 2010 and 35.9% in 2020. In the 2004 United States presidential election, the Democrat John Kerry had lost the county by 33.7%, but in 2008 and 2012, Democrat Barack Obama lost the county by only 7.4% and 3.3% respectively. In 2016, Hillary Clinton won the county for the Democrats for the first time in 36 years, by a 4.4 percentage point margin of victory, in spite of the rightward shift taken by the rest of the country. In 2020, the county swung 16.1 points deeper into the Democratic column, the largest Democratic swing of any county in the country in that election, culminating in Joe Biden winning the county by 20.5 percentage points as he carried Georgia. In doing so, Biden turned in the best showing for a non-Georgian Democrat in the county since John F. Kennedy in 1960. The Democratic trend continued in 2022, with Henry County being one of the few counties where Stacey Abrams improved on her 2018 margin against Republican Brian Kemp even as she performed worse statewide. She took 61% of the vote, and Raphael Warnock defeated Herschel Walker with a similar share of the vote in the concurrent Senate race.

Transportation

Major highways

  Interstate 75
  Interstate 675
  U.S. Route 19
  U.S. Route 23
  U.S. Route 41
  State Route 3
  State Route 20
  State Route 42
  State Route 81
  State Route 138
  State Route 155
  State Route 401 (unsigned designation for I-75)
  State Route 413 (unsigned designation for I-675)
 Georgia State Route 920 (unsigned designation for Jonesboro Road)

Pedestrians and cycling

 Reeves Creek Trail

Transit systems
 Henry County operates its own reservation-based transit service for use by county residents. In addition, Xpress, a regional commuter bus service operated by the Georgia Regional Transportation Authority, serves park-and-ride lots in Stockbridge, Hampton, and McDonough.

Demographics

2020 Census

As of the 2020 United States census, there were 240,712 people, 79,550 households, and 60,471 families residing in the county.

2010 Census
As of the 2010 United States Census, there were 203,922 people, 70,255 households, and 54,445 families residing in the county. The racial makeup of the county was 55.0% white, 36.9% black or African American, 2.9% Asian, 0.3% American Indian, 0.1% Pacific islander, 2.4% from other races, and 2.4% from two or more races. Those of Hispanic or Latino origin made up 5.8% of the population. In terms of ancestry, 10.7% were American, 9.3% were Irish, 9.2% were German, and 8.2% were English.

Of the 70,255 households, 45.6% had children under the age of 18 living with them, 55.9% were married couples living together, 16.4% had a female householder with no husband present, 22.5% were non-families, and 18.5% of all households were made up of individuals. The average household size was 2.89 and the average family size was 3.29. The median age was 35.3 years.

The median income for a household in the county was $63,923 and the median income for a family was $70,972. Males had a median income of $50,198 versus $39,785 for females. The per capita income for the county was $25,773. About 6.3% of families and 8.3% of the population were below the poverty line, including 11.7% of those under age 18 and 5.8% of those age 65 or over.

2000 Census
As of the census of 2000, there were 119,341 people, 41,373 households, and 33,305 families residing in the county. There were 43,166 housing units at an average density of 134 per square mile (52/km2). The racial makeup of the county was 81.38% White, 14.68% Black or African American, 0.23% Native American, 1.76% Asian, 0.04% Pacific Islander, 0.79% from other races, and 1.13% from two or more races. 2.26% of the population were Hispanic or Latino of any race. Census Estimates from the 2008 American Community Survey indicate that the African-American population is 32.6%.

There were 41,373 households, out of which 42.90% had children under the age of 18 living with them, 66.40% were married couples living together, 10.30% had a female householder with no husband present, and 19.50% were non-families. 15.40% of all households were made up of individuals, and 4.00% had someone living alone who was 65 years of age or older. The average household size was 2.87 and the average family size was 3.19.

In the county, the population was spread out, with 29.20% under the age of 18, 7.40% from 18 to 24, 34.90% from 25 to 44, 21.00% from 45 to 64, and 7.40% who were 65 years of age or older. The median age was 33 years. For every 100 females, there were 97.30 males. For every 100 females age 18 and over, there were 93.80 males.

The median income for a household in the county was $57,309, and the median income for a family was $61,607. Males had a median income of $41,449 versus $29,211 for females. The per capita income for the county was $22,945. About 3.70% of families and 4.90% of the population were below the poverty line, including 5.50% of those under age 18 and 7.80% of those age 65 or over.

Economy

Goya Foods has its Atlanta offices in an unincorporated area near McDonough.

Additionally, a pair of warehouses used to exist along US 23 south of McDonough, one of which was owned by Whirlpool Corporation, and the other by Toys 'R' Us.

Media
WKKP is the local radio media outlet. It broadcasts 24 hours a day on 100.9 FM and 1410 AM, and has a classic country format.

The Henry Herald and the Henry County Times are the local county news print media.

Sports
The semi-professional soccer team Georgia Revolution FC plays in the National Premier Soccer League at the Warhawk Stadium.

Atlanta Motor Speedway is located in Henry County and hosts an annual NASCAR race and many other events throughout the year, including the 2021 Publix Atlanta Marathon, which moved to the Speedway premises.

Education
Local public schools are operated by the Henry County Schools.

Enriched Virtual Program
 Impact academy

Alternative schools
 EXCEL Academy (known as Patrick Henry alternative)
 Mainstay Academy (GNETS - Special Education)

Private schools
 ABC Montessori (Toddler - 12)
 Bible Baptist Christian School (K4–12)
 Community Christian School (Nursery–12)
 Creekside Christian Academy
 Eagle's Landing Christian Academy (K3–12)
 Lake Dow Christian Academy
 New Creation Christian Academy
 North Henry Academy (K3–8)
 Strong Rock Christian School (K–12)
 Peoples Baptist Academy
 Heritage Baptist Christian School
 The Sharon School
 McDonough Methodist Academy

Higher education

Mercer University has a Regional Academic Center in McDonough. The center, opened in 2003, offers programs through the university's College of Continuing and Professional Studies and Mercer's Tift College of Education. Clayton State University and Gordon College also offer a range of college courses at the Academy for Advanced Studies in McDonough.

Southern Crescent Technical College's Henry County Center (in McDonough) offers programs in Allied Health, Business Technology, Logistics and Supply Chain Management, Computer Information Systems, Personal Services, Public Safety, and Drafting Technology.

Communities

Cities 
 Hampton
 Locust Grove
 McDonough
 Stockbridge

Census-designated place
 Heron Bay (part)

Unincorporated communities

 Blacksville
 Ellenwood (part)
 Flippen
 Kelleytown
 Luella
 Ola

See also

 National Register of Historic Places listings in Henry County, Georgia
List of counties in Georgia

References

External links
 Henry County Board of Commissioners
 Henry County Chamber of Commerce
 Taste of Henry An annual fundraiser that showcases many of Henry County's best restaurants.
 Kelleytown, GA Website run by Mr. Beau Kelley, a descendant of the original family to which the community is named.
 A Friend's House Henry County's emergency shelter for abused, neglected, and abandoned children.
 Howard, John. "The Sub Series: Henry County, Georgia." Southern Spaces, January 26, 2010.
 Henry County historical marker

 
Georgia (U.S. state) counties
1821 establishments in Georgia (U.S. state)
Populated places established in 1821
Henry
Majority-minority counties in Georgia